Šafarsko is a village on the right bank of the Ščavnica River in the Municipality of Razkrižje in eastern Slovenia, next to the border with Croatia. The area traditionally belonged to Zala County in the Kingdom of Hungary and is now included in the Mura Statistical Region.

The Slovene writer Vlado Žabot was born in the village in 1958.

References

External links
Šafarsko on Geopedia

Populated places in the Municipality of Razkrižje